Allentown (Pennsylvania Dutch: Allenschteddel, Allenschtadt, or Ellsdaun) is a city in Lehigh County in the Commonwealth of Pennsylvania, United States. The city had a population of 125,845 at the 2020 census. Allentown is the fastest-growing major city in Pennsylvania and the state's third-largest city  after Philadelphia and Pittsburgh. It is the largest city in both Lehigh County and the Lehigh Valley, which had a population of 861,899 and was the 68th most populous metropolitan area in the United States as of 2020. Allentown was founded in 1762 and is the county seat of Lehigh County.

Located on the Lehigh River, a  tributary of the Delaware River, Allentown is the largest of three adjacent cities, including Bethlehem and Easton in Lehigh and Northampton counties, in the Lehigh Valley region of eastern Pennsylvania.

History

Origins
In the early 1700s, the area that is now Allentown was a wilderness of scrub oak where Lenape Indian American tribes fished for trout and hunted for deer, grouse, and other game. In 1736, a large area north of Philadelphia was deeded by 23 chiefs of the Five Civilized Tribes to three sons of William Penn: John Penn, Thomas Penn, and Richard Penn. The price for this tract included shoes and buckles, hats, shirts, knives, scissors, combs, needles, looking  glasses, rum, and pipes.

The land was later part of a  plot that William Allen purchased on September 10, 1735, from his business partner Joseph Turner, who was assigned the land's warrant by Thomas Penn on May 18, 1732. The land was surveyed on November 23, 1736 and  again in 1753 as part of an effort to develop a road from Easton to Reading. The 1753 survey reported the presence of a log house owned by Allen that was built around 1740 and located near Jordan Creek's western banks in the city. The house was used primarily as a hunting and fishing lodge, but Allen also used it to entertain prominent guests, including James Hamilton, who was his brother-in-law, and John Penn, who was then governor of the Province of Pennsylvania.

Founding

The geographic area that today includes Center City Allentown was acquired in the 1737 Walking Purchase and initially organized,  established, and named in 1762 by William Allen, a wealthy shipping merchant who served as a mayor of Philadelphia and chief justice of the colonial era Province of Pennsylvania. It is likely that rivalry among the Penns prompted Allen to decide to start the town in 1762. 

A decade earlier, in 1752, Northampton and Berks counties were formed; Easton was named the county seat of Northampton County and Reading the county seat of Berks County. In 1763, a year after Allentown's founding, an effort was made by William Allen and others to move the county seat from Easton to Allentown, but the Penns' influence prevailed and Easton remained the county seat.

The town was located between present-day Fourth and Tenth Streets and Union and Liberty Streets. Many streets on the original plan were named for Allen's children, including Margaret (present-day Fifth Street), William (now Sixth), James (now Eighth), Ann (now Ninth), and John (now Walnut). Allen Street (now Seventh), the city's main thoroughfare, was named for Allen himself. Hamilton Street was named for James Hamilton, deputy governor of colonial-era Pennsylvania from 1748 to 1754. Gordon Street was named for Patrick Gordon, an earlier deputy governor of Colonial Pennsylvania. Chew Street was named for Benjamin Chew, and Turner Street was named for Allen's business partner Joseph Turner. Allen hoped that Northampton Towne would displace Easton as the seat of Northampton County and become a commercial center due to its location along the Lehigh River and proximity to Philadelphia. Allen gave the property to his son James in 1767.

On March 18, 1811, the town was formally incorporated as the borough of Northampton Towne. The following year, on March 6, 1812, Lehigh County was formed from the western half of Northampton County, and Northampton Towne was selected as the county seat. Allentown was formally incorporated as a city on March 12, 1867. The following year, on April 16, 1838, it was officially renamed Allentown after years of popular usage by that name.

American Revolutionary War

Some of the first resistance to British colonialism, which led ultimately to the Revolutionary War, began in and around present day Allentown. On December 21, 1774, a Committee of Observation for Northampton County (Allentown) was formed by local patriots. Immediately following the Declaration of Independence's signing, the Colonial British government in Allentown began to break down and patriot militias took control. They pressured Tories out of the Allentown area, and plans were made for expanding patriot militias. The burden of supplying a military force logistically fell on the people, and requisitions for food, grain, cattle, horses, and cloth became common.

During the Revolutionary War, Hessian prisoners of war were kept in Allentown in the vicinity of present-day Seventh and Gordon Streets. Allentown also housed four hospital structures, including one in the Zion Reformed Church and one in the Farr Building that were used in treating wounded Continental Army soldiers. In 1777, a factory manufacturing paper cartridges for muskets for use in the Revolutionary War was relocated to Allentown from nearby Bethlehem. The same year, a shop of sixteen armourers was established along Little Lehigh Creek and was used in repairing weapons and manufacturing saddles and scabbards.

After his victory in the Battle of Trenton on December 26, 1776, General George Washington and his Continental Army staff passed through Allentown, up Water Street, which is present-day Lehigh Street, where they stopped at the foot of the street at a large spring on what is now the property occupied by Wire Mill. There, Washington and his troops rested and watered their horses, then went their way to their post of duty.

Liberty Bell's hiding

Allentown holds historical significance as the location where the Liberty Bell, then known as the State House Bell, was successfully hidden by American patriots to avoid its capture by the British Army during the Revolutionary War. After Washington's defeat at the Battle of Brandywine in Chadds Ford Township, Pennsylvania on September 11, 1777, the revolutionary capital of Philadelphia was left defenseless and American patriots began preparing for what they saw as an imminent British attack on the city. Pennsylvania's Supreme Executive Council ordered that eleven bells, including the State House Bell and bells from Philadelphia's Christ Church and St. Peter's Church, be taken down and moved out of Philadelphia to protect them from the British, who would melt the bells down to cast into munitions. The bells were transported north to Northampton Towne (present day Allentown) by two farmers and wagon masters, John Snyder and Henry Bartholomew, and hidden under floorboards in the basement of Zion Reformed Church in what is now Center City Allentown, just prior to the September 1777 fall of Philadelphia's to the British. 

Today, a shrine and museum in the church's basement at 622 West Hamilton Street in Allentown, known as the Liberty Bell Museum, marks and celebrates the precise Allentown location where the Liberty Bell was successfully hidden for nine months from September 1777 until its June 18, 1778, return to Philadelphia following the British departure from Philadelphia.

Early Allentown

Following the Revolutionary War, Northampton Towne began to slowly grow. Prior to American Revolution, there were 54 homes in Northampton Towne with approximately 330 residents. In 1782, there were 59 houses and over a hundred cows were stabled in the town. The town was described by a visitor in 1783: "One gets a glimpse of many good stone houses, many of them very neat, and everything about the premises shows good order and attention. The people are mainly German who speak bad English and distressing German." In 1795, the U.S. Gazetteer described Allentown as: A handsome and flourishing town of Northampton County, pleasantly situated on the point of land formed by the junction of the Jordan Creek and Little Lehigh. It is regularly laid out and contains about ninety dwellings, a German Lutheran and a Calvinist (Zion) Church, an Academy and three merchant mills.

In 1792, land north of Allentown was purchased by Lehigh Coal & Navigation Company for mining. However, it proved difficult to transport anthracite coal over the primitive trail system that then existed. As a result, very little was mined until 1818, when the company began constructing Lehigh Canal to transport coal from Mauch Chunk, later renamed Jim Thorpe, to Easton, located down the Lehigh River at the river's confluence with the Delaware River. In 1829, Lehigh Canal, a -long canal on the Lehigh River's east side, was completed for both ascending and descending navigation. Its construction was the most important factor in making anthracite coal, one of the nation's most important domestic and industrial fuels. However, the canal's operational life was short. In 1855, the first railroad was built on the Lehigh River's west side. Rail transport led to a steady decline in canal traffic.

Until 1803, residents of Northampton Towne received their mail in Bethlehem. That year, however, a post office was established inside Compass and Square Hotel at what today is Penn National Bank building on Hamilton Street. After reaching a population of over 700 residents in the 1810 U.S. census, the Commonwealth of Pennsylvania gave Northampton Towne legal standing on March 18, 1811, incorporating it as the Borough of Northampton in what then was Northampton County. The new borough government's first undertaking was ordering that cows be moved from public streets and into pastures, which proved unpopular. In 1812, Lehigh County was established by partitioning a section of Northampton County.

In the early 1800s, Allentown, then often called Allen's Town, grew primarily as a court and market town. The name became so common that, in 1838, the city's name was officially changed to Allentown. The first bank, Northampton Bank, was chartered in July 1814 at the northeast corner of Center Square and the first Hamilton Street Bridge, a -long chain structure, was constructed over the Lehigh River. The bridge featured two suspended lanes, one for east and one for westbound traffic, and a toll house at the bridge's western end.

The 1840s were challenging to Allentown; in 1841, a flood swept away Hamilton Street Bridge and inflicted substantial damage on areas of the city located by Lehigh River. Two years later, in 1843, Northampton Bank failed as a result of the bank's excessive speculation, resulting in financial ruin for many families. Then, on June 1, 1848, a large fire burned down most of Allentown's Central Business District between Seventh and Eighth Streets on Hamilton Street. During the 1850s, however, the city began recovering economically. A new bridge was built across the Lehigh River, and brick buildings were constructed to replace wooden ones that were burned in the 1848 fire. In 1852, the first Allentown Fair was held.

American Civil War

 
On April 13, 1861, as tensions between the nation's North and South increased and southern states voted to secede from the Union, Lehigh and Northampton County residents called a public meeting in Easton to take steps to support the federal government. At this meeting, citizens voted to establish and equip a new military unit, the 1st Pennsylvania Volunteer Infantry, and placed Captain Samuel Yohe of Easton and Thomas W. Lynn in charge, awarding them the respective ranks of colonel and major. Tilghman H. Good of South Whitehall Township, who had previously served as captain of the Allentown militia unit known as the Allen Rifles before being awarded the command of the Pennsylvania National Guard's 4th Regiment prior to the southern states' secession, was then placed in charge of the 1st Pennsylvania's Company I, which was composed of his former Allen Rifles subordinates plus the members of another Allentown-based militia, the Jordan Artillerists, which were commanded by Captain William H. Gausler. Shortly thereafter, the 1st Pennsylvania's command structure was restructured, awarding Good the rank of lieutenant colonel and advancing him to the position of second in command, thereby making Gausler captain of the 1st Pennsylvania's Company I.

These units from Allentown were then deployed in response to President Lincoln's call for 75,000 volunteers to defend the nation's capital from a threatened invasion by the Confederate States Army. In recognition of their early service, many of these soldiers became known, post-war, as Pennsylvania First Defenders because they were part of the first five units to reach Washington, D.C. After performing their Three Months' Service from April through July 1861, they were honorably discharged and sent home, where a significant number opted to re-enlist because the military crisis had not yet ended.

47th Regiment, Pennsylvania Volunteer Infantry 

On August 5, 1861, Andrew Gregg Curtin, Pennsylvania's Civil War-era governor, granted authority to Good to create the 47th Pennsylvania Infantry Regiment, a new unit that was more commonly known as the 47th Pennsylvania Volunteers. Good secured help from William H. Gausler of Allentown, who was commissioned as a major with the regiment's central command staff, and John Peter Shindel Gobin, a senior officer with the Sunbury Guards in Northumberland County, who would be repeatedly cited for valor and promoted until being commissioned as colonel and final commanding officer of the regiment. Companies A and E of the regiment were recruited primarily from Easton and Northampton County, and Companies B, G, I, and K were largely recruited from Allentown while Company C was recruited from Northumberland and Juniata counties, Company F was primarily composed of men from Catasaqua, and Companies D and H were recruited from Perry County. The 47th Pennsylvania Volunteers were the only Pennsylvania regiment to fight in the Union Army's 1864 Red River campaign across Louisiana. They previously achieved victory in the Battle of St. Johns Bluff in Florida (October 1–3, 1862) before suffering a costly defeat in the Battle of Pocotaligo in South Carolina (October 21–23, 1862). After sustaining numerous casualties during the Red River Campaign in the spring of 1864, the 47th Pennsylvania then helped turn the Civil War in the Union's favor with victories in General Sheridan's 1864 Shenandoah Valley campaign across Virginia, including the Battles of Berryville, Opequan, Fisher's Hill, and Cedar Creek before contributing to the defense of the nation's capital following Lincoln's assassination in April 1865. Other known Union Army units from Allentown included the 5th, 41st, 128th, and 176th Pennsylvania Infantries.

On October 19, 1899, Allentown erected and dedicated the Soldiers and Sailors Monument, which still stands in the city's center square at Seventh and Hamilton Streets, in honor of Union soldiers from Allentown and local Lehigh Valley towns and boroughs who were killed during the Civil War in defense of the Union.

Industrialization

The opening of Lehigh Canal quickly transformed Allentown and the surrounding Lehigh Valley from a rural agricultural area dominated by German-speaking people into one America's first urbanized industrialized areas and expanded the city's commercial and industrial capacity. With this, Allentown underwent significant industrialization, ultimately becoming a major center for heavy industry and manufacturing.

Allentown's industrial development accelerated in the late 18th century. David Deshler, Allentown's first shopkeeper, opened a sawmill in the city in 1782. By 1814, industrial plants in Allentown included flour mills, sawmills, two saddle makers, a tannery and tan yard, a woolen mill, a card weaving plant, two gunsmiths, two tobacconists, two clock-makers, and two printers. In 1855, the first railroads to reach Allentown were opened, representing direct competition for Lehigh Canal's coal transport. Lehigh and Susquehanna Railroad ordered four locomotives and stations to be built in Allentown, Easton, and Mauch Chunk. In September 1855, the railroad became operational, providing connections between Allentown and New York City, made through the Central Railroad of New Jersey, and connections with Philadelphia made through Perkiomen Railroad, which operated between Norristown and Freemansburg.

In the 1840s, iron ore beds were discovered in hills around Allentown, and a furnace was constructed in 1846 by Allentown Iron Core Company for production of pig iron. The furnace opened in 1847 under supervision of Samuel Lewis, an expert in iron production, leading to the opening of other Allentown plants for production of a wide variety of metal products. Allentown Rolling Mill Company was created in 1860 from a merger of several smaller companies and became the most significant iron company in the city. Although not as large as the iron and steel industry in neighboring Bethlehem in the latter half of the 19th century, Allentown became a major national hub for the nation's iron ore production.

In 1850, Henry Leh contributed significantly to Allentown's industrialization with the opening of Leh's, a shoe and ready-to-wear clothing store. By 1861, Leh's provided the Union Army with much-needed military boots. During the Civil War, in addition to Leh's, eight brick yards, a saw mill, Allentown Paint factory, two additional shoe factories, a piano factory, flour mills, breweries, and distilleries opened in Allentown.

Allentown Boiler Works was founded in Allentown in 1883 by Charles Collum. He and his partner John D. Knouse built a large facility at Third and Gordon Streets in Allentown's First Ward near the Lehigh Valley Railroad yard by Jeter's Island, which was later named Kline's Island. The company manufactured iron products, some of which were used in constructing the White House and the U.S. Military Academy at West Point. The company's boilers and kilns were used nationally and abroad in Canada, Cuba, and the Philippines.

In addition to its iron and railroad industries, Allentown developed a strong beer brewing industry, including several notable breweries, the Horlacher Brewery (founded 1897, closed 1978), Neuweiler Brewery (founded 1875, closed 1968), and Schaefer Beer, whose brewery was later acquired by Pabst and Guinness and is now owned by Boston Beer Company, brewer of Samuel Adams beer.

Brickworks flourished in Allentown through the end of World War I. The clay unearthed in various sections of the Allentown area proved suitable in manufacturing building brick and fire brick. Bricks were the first Allentown products shipped by rail and sold nationally. Food processing started in Allentown following the arrival of bakers, who were among Allentown's first settlers. In 1887, Wilson Arbogast and Morris C. Bastian formed Arbogast and Bastian, which provided commercial slaughtering on a large scale.

With industrialization, Allentown became a major banking and finance center. In 1860, William H. Ainey founded Allentown Savings and was chosen its first president. In 1863–64, Second National Bank of Allentown was formed, and Ainey was elected its first president, a position he held until his death. Ainey contributed to Allentown's industrial and retail growth, helping finance Iowa Barb Wire Company, which was later absorbed by American Steel & Wire, Pioneer Silk Factory, Palace Silk Mill, and Allentown Spinning Company.

In the late 1870s, Allentown's iron industry collapsed, leaving the city economically depressed. To prevent this from recurring, efforts were made to diversify the city's industrial base, including convincing Phoenix Manufacturing Company to open a silk mill in Allentown. Adelaide Mill at Race and Court Streets prompted the opening of Pioneer Silk Mill in 1886, and the city emerged as one of the nation's leading silk manufacturing centers. The silk industry grew to be Allentown's largest industry and remained the largest industry until the late 20th century. By 1914, there were 26 silk mills in Allentown. By 1928, when rayon was introduced, the number grew to 85, and over 10,000 people were employed in the Allentown silk industry at its height during the 1940s.

In 1896, Max Hess, a retailer from Perth Amboy, New Jersey, visited Allentown and set about developing Allentown's first department store. He his brother Charles opened Hess Brothers on Ninth and Hamilton Streets, which developed a reputation for flamboyance and offered the latest European fashion apparel. Zollinger-Harned Company, housed in the Zollinger-Harned Company Building on Hamilton Street, became Allentown's third major department store.

20th century
In 1905, Jack and Gus Mack moved their motor car plant, Mack Trucks, from Brooklyn to Allentown, taking over foundries of Weaver-Hirsh company on South 10th Street. By 1914, Mack Trucks developed a global reputation for manufacturing sturdy and reliable trucks and vehicles. Many were sent to Western Front battlefields in France before the U.S. formally entered World War I in 1917. The British gave Mack AC's five and seven-ton trucks the nickname "Bulldog". Mack eventually grew to have eight manufacturing plants in Allentown and adopted the bulldog as it corporate brand.

In the post-World War II era, on October 11, 1945, Western Electric opened a plant on Allentown's Union Boulevard and, on October 1, 1951, the world's first transistor production began at the plant. Western Electric's Allentown plant quickly emerged as a national leader in the post-war electronics revolution.

Like several other areas of Pennsylvania, Allentown residents continued speaking Pennsylvania German well into the early 20th century. Pennsylvania guide, compiled by the Writers' Project of the Works Progress Administration, described Allentown's historical patterns of immigration and the Pennsylvania Dutch community on Allentown's linguistic landscape over the first half of the 20th century, noting in 1940 that:

By the mid-20th century, Allentown was a major retailing and entertainment center distinct and separate from Philadelphia and New York City. Hess's, Leh's, and Zollinger department stores led to retail sector growth in Allentown, and dozens of smaller retail stores, restaurants, hotels, banks, and professional offices in the city emerged in what was then called downtown Allentown and today is Center City Allentown. At least seven cinemas and stage theaters were developed along Hamilton Street between Fifth and Tenth Streets.

Late 20th century

By the mid-1960s, Allentown's economy had been booming for decades but the city's rising taxes and an inability to expand the city's geographic limits led to migration of much of Allentown's baby boom generation to the city's suburbs. Salisbury, South Whitehall, and Whitehall townships each had large areas of farmland that were prime locations for residential real estate development. Allentown began being drained of its working class, who began migrating to these newer, less-expensive housing in Allentown's suburbs, which offered lower taxes, green space, less crime, and newer schools.

These demographic developments continued throughout the 1960s and the latter part of the 20th century, challenging Allentown's city government and Allentown School District with greatly diminished resources. Allentown School District's financial challenges, in turn, further increased the number of working class families who fled the city for its suburbs, creating a sea change in the city's demographics. With the departure of many working-class families from older Center City Allentown neighborhoods, many homes were sold to landlords who converted them into inexpensive multi-family apartments, many of which became government-subsidized housing permitted under the city's lax zoning enforcement and permissive city codes.

With Allentown's neighborhoods and school system declining, the city focused on attempting to develop its Hamilton Street retail district, largely ignoring neighborhoods around Center City. But this actually exacerbated the move of Allentown families to the city's suburbs, and shopping centers and services began being developed outside the city to accommodate these growing communities. In 1966, Whitehall Mall, the first closed shopping mall north of Philadelphia, opened. Ten years later, in 1976, the even larger Lehigh Valley Mall opened north of U.S. Route 22. Stores in Allentown's downtown shopping district began closing, replaced with stores whose customers were less affluent. Large areas of Allentown's downtown were subsequently torn down and replaced with parking lots. The downtown business district was rebuilt in an attempt to compete with the newer suburban shopping locations. A multi-block row of stores known as the Hamilton Mall was developed, including covered sidewalks and reduced traffic. But the effort was unsuccessful, and two of the city's major department stores, Leh's and Zollingers, closed by 1990. The third, Hess's, which was sold to The Bon-Ton in 1994 and subsequently closed in 1996. In 1993, the Corporate Center, the city's new flagship business center on North Seventh Street, fell victim to a large sinkhole, which led to its condemnation and ultimate demolition.

Combined with challenges confronting Center City Allentown, the manufacturing economy of the Northeastern United States began suffering from deindustrialization associated with foreign competition, trade policies, and manufacturing costs, and many Allentown factories and corporations began closing or relocating. Mack Trucks relocated to Greensboro, North Carolina; Agere Systems (formerly Western Electric) moved to San Jose, California; and other Allentown-based factories downsized considerably or ceased operations. With the city's manufacturing base eroded, once high-paying industrial jobs were replaced with lower-paying service sector jobs, and Allentown being cited globally as one of the most prominent examples of the late 20th century Rust Belt.

21st century
In the 2000s and 2010s, Allentown's economy has continued reforming, largely led by service industries, th health care, transportation, warehousing, and some continued manufacturing. Allentown Economic Development Corporation (AEDC) operates a business incubator, Bridgeworks, which seeks to attract and support young commercial and manufacturing businesses in Allentown. In 2009, the Neighborhood Improvement Zone (NIZ) was created by the Pennsylvania State Legislature to encourage Allentown's development and revitalization.

Center City Allentown underwent a major restructuring in 2014, including constructing and opening PPL Center, a 10,500-capacity indoor arena that now hosts the Lehigh Valley Phantoms, a professional American Hockey League ice hockey team, and other sports, entertainment, and concert events. Center City Allentown's redevelopment also included the opening of a full-service Renaissance Hotel and redeveloped office buildings.

Geography

Topography

Bodies of water include Jordan Creek and its tributary, Little Lehigh Creek, which join within the city limits and empty into the Lehigh River. Other bodies of water in Allentown include Lake Muhlenberg in Cedar Creek Parkway and a pond in Trexler Park.

Adjacent counties
Adjacent counties to the Lehigh Valley include Carbon County to its north, Northampton County to its northeast and east, Bucks County to its southeast, Montgomery County to its south, and Berks County and Schuylkill County to its west.

Cityscape and neighborhoods
 
Center City Allentown, which includes the downtown area and its 7th Street retail and residential corridor, is the city's central business district and various city, county, and federal government buildings. To the east of Center City are The Wards, residential areas developed during the city's late 19th century and early 20th century industrial boom. Just east of the Lehigh River are the city's East Side residential neighborhoods, most of which border various routes to nearby Bethlehem. South of Center City and across Little Lehigh Creek are the city's South Side neighborhoods, which border Emmaus. Allentown's West End, with a mix of commercial corridors, cultural centers, and larger single-family residences, begins approximately west of 15th Street.

Other Center City landmarks include Allentown Art Museum, Miller Symphony Hall, Baum School of Art, Lehigh County Historical Society, Heritage Museum, and Liberty Bell Museum. The city's central business district has several office buildings, Dime Savings and Trust Company building, One City Center, Two City Center, and others. An 8,641-seat indoor arena, the PPL Center, which hosts the Lehigh Valley Phantoms of the American Hockey League, opened in August 2014. In January 2015, Americus Hotel and a Marriott Hotel opened.

Architecture

Allentown is characterized by a large stock of historic homes, commercial structures, and century-old industrial buildings reflecting its standing as one of the nation's earliest urban centers. Allentown's Center City neighborhoods include Victorian and terraced rowhomes. West Park includes mostly Victorian and American Craftsman-style architecture. Houses on Allentown's tree-lined streets in the West End were built mostly between the 1920s and 1940s. Houses in Allentown's East and South Sides are a mixture of architectural styles and are generally single and twin family homes built between the 1940s and 1960s; both areas include some older Victorian homes. Allentown has many loft apartments in converted mills and historic brick manufacturing buildings and modern and historic high-rise apartment buildings in Center City.

The building was designed by New York City architectural firm Helme, Corbett, and Harrison. Wallace Harrison designed the building, which later served as a prototype for the Art Deco architecture of Rockefeller Center in New York City. Built between 1926 and 1928, the building's exterior decorative friezes were designed by Alexander Archipenko. The building opened July 16, 1928. The building has been illuminated at night since its 1928 opening and, in clear weather, can be seen from as far north as the Blue Mountain Ski Area. The building is featured in the 1954 movie Executive Suite. Exterior shots of the PPL Building appear in the 1954 motion picture Executive Suite.

One of the city's older surviving structures, Miller Symphony Hall, at 23 North 6th Street, opened in 1896 and originally housed the city's public market. Allentown's premier performing arts facility with 1,100 seats, it is home of the Allentown Symphony Orchestra. The structure was converted to a theater in 1899 by architectural firm J. B. McElfatrick and later renamed the Lyric Theater. It is one of roughly a dozen famous McElfatrick designs still standing in the nation and has been used for burlesque shows, vaudeville, silent films, symphony orchestras, and other entertainment for over a century. Other performing arts facilities and programs include Pennsylvania Sinfonia, Community Concerts of Allentown, Allentown Band, and Community Music School of the Lehigh Valley.

Allentown has three primary historic districts: Old Allentown, the Old Fairgrounds, and West Park. Old Allentown and Old Fairgrounds are Center City neighborhoods that hold a joint house tour organized by the Old Allentown Preservation Association (OAPA) annually each September. West Park also offers a tour of its Victorian and Craftsman-style homes.

Climate

Under the Köppen climate classification, Allentown falls within either a hot-summer humid continental climate (Dfa) if the  isotherm is used or a humid subtropical climate (Cfa) if the  isotherm is used. Summers are typically warm and muggy, fall and spring are generally mild, and winter is cool to cold. Precipitation is almost uniformly distributed throughout the year.

February is generally the driest month with only  of average precipitation. January temperatures average below freezing, seven months average above 50 °F (10 °C,), and two months average above 22 °C (71.6 °F.)

Snowfall is variable with some winters bringing light snow and others bringing multiple and significant snowstorms. Average snowfall is  seasonally with February receiving the highest snowfall at just under .
Allentown falls under the USDA 6b Plant Hardiness zone, now 7a under the 1991 to 2020 climate normals mean minimum.

Crime
For 2010, crime in Allentown diminished for a fourth consecutive year, led by a 31 percent drop in homicides (down to 9 from 13), motor vehicle theft (down 11 percent), burglary (down 6 percent), and diminished numbers of reported robberies, rapes, and property crimes. The number of violent crimes fell more than 30 percent between 2006 and 2010. These improvements were offset by increases in aggravated assault and arson cases in the city. Allentown has organized violent gangs, and the city has experienced sporadic gang-related crime and violence. On June 20, 2019, two rival gangs, the Bloods and Latin Kings, shot 10 people when the two gangs exchanged gunfire outside Deja Vu nightclub on Hamilton Street.

Demographics

As of the 2020 U.S. census, there were 125,845 people residing in Allentown. Of these, 54.2% were Hispanic/Latino, 30.2% non-hispanic White, 10.4% non-hispanic Black, 1.9% Asian, 0.1% Native American or Pacific Islander, and 3.2% mixed or other. As of 2010, Allentown had 42,032 households, including 28.8% with children under age 18, 39.4% who were married couples living together, 15.1% who had a female householder with no husband present, and 40.2% who were non-families. 33.1% of all households were made up of individuals, and 12.8% had someone living alone who was 65 years of age or older. The city's average household size is 2.42 and the average family size is 3.09. As of 2000, the population density was 6,011.5 inhabitants per square mile (2,320.8/km); there were 45,960 housing units at an average density of 2,591.1 per square mile (1,000.3/km).

As of 2010, Allentown's population broken down by age ranges is: 24.8% under 18, 11.2% from 18 to 24, 29.8% from 25 to 44, 19.1% from 45 to 64, and 15.1% 65 years or older. The median age is 34 years. For every 100 females, there are 91.8 males. For every 100 females age 18 and over, there are 87.7 males. The median income for a household in the city was $32,016, and the median income for a family was $37,356. Males had a median income of $30,426 versus $23,882 for females. Per capita income in Allentown, as of 2010, was $16,282 with 18.5% of the population and 14.6% of families below the poverty line. 29.4% of those under age 18 and 10.3% of those 65 and older live below the poverty line. The unemployment rate for the entire Lehigh Valley area is 9.8% as of February 2010 with Allentown's unemployment rate slightly higher at over 10%.

Economy

Allentown historically was a hub for the nation's earliest industrialization and its economy was heavily manufacturing-based. Beginning in the late 20th century, the city evolved into a more service-oriented economy due to Rust Belt decline in heavy industry that commenced around 1980 and accelerated through the 20th century's last two decades. Allentown is corporate headquarters for several large companies, including Air Products, Talen Energy, PPL Corporation, and others. The largest employer in Allentown, as of 2007, is Lehigh Valley Health Network with over 7,800 employees. Lehigh Valley Health Network's flagship hospital, Lehigh Valley Hospital–Cedar Crest, is Pennsylvania's third largest hospital with 877 licensed beds and 46 operating rooms. 

Center City Allentown, along Hamilton Street between 5th and 10th Streets, was the primary shopping district in Allentown for most of the 20th century. During the 1960s and 1970s, however, several shopping malls, including South Mall, Lehigh Valley Mall and Whitehall Mall were built in Allentown's suburbs and today represent the most popular shopping destinations. In October 2006, The Promenade Shops at Saucon Valley opened south of Allentown in Upper Saucon Township.

Arts, culture, and recreation

Amusement park

Allentown is home to Dorney Park & Wildwater Kingdom, one of the nation's largest amusement and water parks. Dorney Park's Steel Force rollercoaster is the world's eighth longest steel rollercoaster.

Arts and entertainment

Allentown Symphony Orchestra performs at Miller Symphony Hall, located on North 6th Street in Center City. The city has a musical heritage of civilian concert bands and is home to the Allentown Band, the nation's oldest civilian concert band. The Allentown Band, Marine Band of Allentown, Municipal Band of Allentown, and Pioneer Band of Allentown all perform regularly at the bandshell in the city's West Park. Allentown's J. Birney Crum Stadium, Pennsylvania's second largest high school football field, hosts the annual Drum Corps International Eastern Classic, which brings together the world's top junior drum and bugle corps for a two-day event.

Allentown houses a collection of public sculptures, including the DaVinci Horse, located on 5th Street, which is one of only three daVinci sculptures in the world. Allentown Art Museum, located on North 5th Street in Center City, is home to a collection of over 13,000 pieces of art and an associated library. Baum School of Art, located at 5th and Linden Streets, offers credit and non-credit classes in painting, drawing, ceramics, fashion design, jewelry making, and other arts-related curriculum.

Nineteenth Street Theater has an 80-plus year history of producing theater in the Lehigh Valley. Started by two Morning Call reporters in 1927 as Civic Little Theater, Nineteenth Street Theater today has paid professional staff, a volunteer board of directors from the community, and volunteer staff. The theater operates the Lehigh Valley's only full-time cinema, showing art, independent and foreign films, and offers a theater school that has served the Valley's youth for over 50 years. The theatre is professionally directed and managed and utilizes community actors in its live theater productions.

Cuisine

Vestiges of Allentown's Pennsylvania German heritage are prominent in the city's cuisine. Foodstuffs such as scrapple, chow-chow, Lebanon bologna, cole slaw, and apple butter are often found in local diners and the Allentown Farmer's Market. Shoofly pie, birch beer, and funnel cakes are regularly found at local fairs. Several local churches make and sell fastnachts in fundraisers for Fastnacht Day, the day before Lent's commencement.

As Allentown's population has increased over the decades, many national restaurant and fast food chains have established a presence in the city. Growth of the city's ethnic populations has led to the opening of many family-run restaurants specializing in ethnic cuisine, including Chinese, Colombian, Dominican, Italian, Japanese, Mexican, Lebanese, Portuguese, Puerto Rican, Thai, and West Indian restaurants. 

Due in part to Allentown's proximity to Philadelphia, cheesesteaks are immensely popular. Yocco's Hot Dogs, a regionally well-known hot dog and cheesesteak establishment with four area locations (two of which are in Allentown), was founded in 1922 by Theodore Iacocca, uncle of former Chrysler chairman and president Lee Iacocca. A-Treat Bottling Company, a regionally-popular soft drink beverage company, has been based in Allentown since its 1918 founding.

Festivals

The Great Allentown Fair runs annually the end of August and early September on the grounds of the Allentown Fairgrounds on North 17th Street, where it has been held continuously since 1889. The first Allentown Fair was held in 1852. Prior to moving to the Allentown Fairgrounds in 1889, it was held at the Old Allentown Fairgrounds, located north of Liberty Street between 5th and 6th Streets.

Blues, Brews, and Barbeque, a blues festival launched in 2014, is held annually in June on Hamilton Street in Center City. Annually each May, Mayfair festival, a three-day arts festival, is held on the campus of Cedar Crest College in Allentown.

Landmarks and popular locations

The Soldiers and Sailors monument at Allentown's Center Square at Seventh and Hamilton Street honors Allentown and Lehigh Valley volunteer soldiers in the Union Army who were killed in defense of the Union during the American Civil War. The monument is topped by a statue representing the Goddess of Liberty. The monument was unveiled October 19, 1899. In 1957, the statue atop the monument was removed due to its state of disrepair and was replaced in 1964. The city's motto, in Latin, is Sic semper tyrannis, meaning "thus always to tyrants", suggesting that bad but justified outcomes will ultimately befall all tyrants.

Museums and cultural organizations

 Allentown Art Museum, art museum
 Allentown Band, nation's oldest civilian concert band
 Allentown Symphony Orchestra, symphony orchestra
 America on Wheels, automotive transportation museum
 Baum School of Art, non-profit community art school
 Da Vinci Science Center, science museum
 Lehigh County Historical Society, local historical society and museum
 Liberty Bell Museum, historical museum
 Marine Band of Allentown, civilian concert band
 Municipal Band of Allentown, civilian concert band
 Museum of Indian Culture, Lenape Indian educational center
 Nineteenth Street Theater, cinema

Parks and recreation

Much of Allentown's park system is a product of industrialist Harry Clay Trexler's efforts. Inspired by the City Beautiful movement in the early 20th century, Trexler helped create West Park, a  park in what was then a community trash pit and sandlot baseball field in an upscale area of the city. The park, which opened in 1909, features a bandshell designed by Philadelphia architect Horace Trumbauer and has long been home to the Allentown Band and other community bands. Trexler also facilitated the development of Trexler Park, Cedar Parkway, Allentown Municipal Golf Course, and Trout Nursery in Lehigh Parkway and was responsible for the development of the Trexler Trust, which provides ongoing private funding for Allentown's park system's maintenance and development.

Allentown's parks include Bicentennial Park, a 4,600 seat mini-stadium built for sporting events, the 127-acre Cedar Creek Parkway, which includes Lake Muhlenberg, Cedar Beach, and Malcolm W. Gross Memorial Rose Garden, East Side Reservoir (15 acres), Irving Street Park, Kimmets Lock Park (5 acres), Lehigh Canal Park (55 acres), Lehigh Parkway (999 acres), Old Allentown Cemetery (4 acres), Jordan Park, South Mountain Reservoir (157 acres), Trexler Park (134 acres), Trout Creek Parkway (100 acres), Joe Daddona Park (19 acres), Keck Park, Percy Ruhe Park, also known as Alton Park, and West Park (6.59 acres).

Sports

Allentown and its surrounding Lehigh Valley region are known for high quality high school-level athletics, and the region has been the starting ground for a considerable number of professional and Olympic-level athletes.

Collegiate athletics

Both Cedar Crest College and Muhlenberg College in Allentown have collegiate athletic programs in most sports. The Muhlenberg Mules play their home football games at Scotty Wood Stadium on the Muhlenberg campus in Allentown.

High school athletics

Allentown's three large high schools, Allen, Dieruff, and Central Catholic, each compete in the Eastern Pennsylvania Conference, one of the nation's premier high school athletic divisions. All three Allentown high schools play their home football games at the 15,000 capacity J. Birney Crum Stadium at 2027 Linden Street, the state's second largest high school stadium.

Lehigh Valley IronPigs baseball

Professional baseball has a rich history in Allentown dating back to 1884. The city is home to the Lehigh Valley IronPigs, the Triple-A Minor League affiliate of the Philadelphia Phillies who play at Coca-Cola Park, a $50.25 million, 8,200-seat stadium on Allentown's east-side.

Lehigh Valley Phantoms ice hockey

Allentown is home to the Lehigh Valley Phantoms, the primary development team of the Philadelphia Flyers, who compete in the American Hockey League and play at PPL Center, an 8,500-seat indoor arena in Center City Allentown.

Parkettes gymnastics

Allentown is home to the Parkettes National Gymnastics Training Center, which has been the training ground for several Olympians and U.S. national gymnastics champions. In 2003, the program was the subject of an immensely critical CNN documentary, Achieving the Perfect 10, which depicted it as a hugely demanding and competitive gymnastics training center.

Historical teams
Historically, Allentown hosted the Allentown Jets, a Continental Basketball Association team that played in Rockne Hall at Allentown Central Catholic High School from 1958 to 1981. The Jets were one of the most dominant franchises in the league's history, winning eight playoff championships and twelve division titles. Allentown has been home to two professional soccer teams, the Pennsylvania Stoners (2007-2009) and Northampton Laurels (2005-2008) of the now defunct Women's Premier Soccer League. The Pennsylvania ValleyDawgs of the now defunct U.S. Basketball League played their home games at William Allen High School during the league's existence from 1999 to 2006.

Government

Allentown is legally classified as a Pennsylvania third-class city and has operated with the strong-mayor version of the mayor-council form of government since 1970. The mayor serves as the city's chief executive and administrative officer, and the city council serves as the legislative and oversight body. Elected "at-large," the mayor serves a four-year term under the city's home rule charter. The current city mayor is Democrat Matthew Tuerk. The legislative branch, the Allentown City Council, includes seven council members elected at large for four-year staggered terms. City Council holds regular public meetings in order to enact city legislation, including ordinances and resolutions. The current president of the City Council is Julio Guridy. The City Controller, who is responsible for oversight of the city's finances, is elected and serves a four-year term.

Federally, Allentown is part of Pennsylvania's 7th congressional district, represented currently by Democrat Susan Wild. U.S. Senators representing the city currently are Democrats Bob Casey, Jr. and John Fetterman. Pennsylvania's governor is Democrat Josh Shapiro.

Education

Primary and secondary education

Allentown School District, Pennsylvania's fourth largest school district, manages the city's public school system with the exception of a small portion of the city near Trexler Park that is in Parkland School District. Allentown has two large public high schools for grades 9–12, William Allen High School, which serves students from Allentown's southern and western sections, and Louis E. Dieruff High School, which serves students from the eastern and northern parts. Each of these Allentown area high schools competes athletically in the Eastern Pennsylvania Conference, an elite high school athletic conference including the 18 largest high schools in the Lehigh Valley and Pocono Mountain regions. Both schools and Allentown Central Catholic High School, the city's sole parochial high school, play their home football games at J. Birney Crum Stadium, the second largest high school stadium in the state. Students may also attend Newcomer Academy at Midway Manor or the Allentown School District Virtual Academy for grades 8 through 12.

Allentown School District's four middle schools, for grades 6–8, are: Francis D. Raub Middle School, Harrison-Morton Middle School, South Mountain Middle School, and Trexler Middle School. The city is served by 16 elementary schools for kindergarten through fifth grade: Central, Cleveland, Hiram W. Dodd, Jefferson, Lehigh Parkway, Lincoln, Luis A. Ramos, McKinley, Midway Manor, Mosser, Muhlenberg, Ritter, Roosevelt, Sheridan, Union Terrace, and Washington. 

Allentown also has two public charter schools: Roberto Clemente Charter School, located at 4th and Walnut Streets in Allentown, is a Title I charter school that provides educational services to mainly Hispanic students in grades 6 through 12, and Lincoln Leadership Academy Charter School, located at 1414 E. Cedar Street, is open to K to 12 students.

Other Allentown-based parochial schools serving K to 8 include Saint John Vianney Regional School, Holy Spirit School, Lehigh Christian Academy, Mercy Special Learning Center, Our Lady Help of Christians School, Sacred Heart School, and Saint Thomas More School. Roman Catholic-affiliated parochial schools in Allentown are operated by the Roman Catholic Diocese of Allentown. Grace Montessori School is a pre-school and early elementary Montessori school run as an outreach of Grace Episcopal Church. Allentown has one private Jewish school, Jewish Day School, and two independent day schools, CAI Learning Academy, an independent day school, and The Swain School, which is associated with Moravian Academy.

Colleges and universities

Two four-year colleges, Cedar Crest College and Muhlenberg College, are based in Allentown. Allentown is also home to a satellite campus of Lehigh Carbon Community College (LCCC), a comprehensive community college that offers two-year and four-year degree programs, continuing education, and industry training.

Media

Television
Allentown is part of the Philadelphia media market, the fourth largest television market in the nation. Major Philadelphia-based network stations serving Allentown include KYW-TV Channel 3 (CBS), WCAU Channel 10 (NBC), WPVI Channel 6 (ABC), and WTXF Channel 29 (Fox). Two television stations are located in Allentown: WFMZ-TV Channel 69, based in Allentown with studios and a transmitting site atop South Mountain, is an independent station, and WLVT-TV Channel 39, the regional PBS affiliate, is licensed to Allentown with studios in neighboring Bethlehem.

Radio
Nielsen Audio ranks Allentown the nation's 74th largest radio market as of 2022. Stations licensed to Allentown include WAEB-AM (talk, news, and sports), WAEB-FM (contemporary hits), WDIY (NPR public radio), WHOL (rhythmic contemporary), WLEV (adult contemporary), WMUH (Muhlenberg College freeform campus radio), WSAN (oldies and Philadelphia Phillies broadcasts), WZZO (classic rock), and others. In addition, many stations from New York City, the nation's largest radio market, and Philadelphia, the nation's fourth largest radio market, are received in Allentown.

Newspapers and magazines
Allentown has two daily newspapers, The Morning Call and The Express-Times. The Times News, based in Lehighton, also covers the city. Several weekly and monthly print publications are based in Allentown or cover the city's news and people.

Transportation

Airports

The airport has direct flights to Atlanta, Charlotte, Chicago–O'Hare, Detroit, Philadelphia, and multiple cities in Florida. The region is also served by Allentown Queen City Municipal Airport, a two-runway facility located on Lehigh Street in South Allentown used predominantly by private aircraft.

Roads and buses

The most prominent highway passing through the city limits of Allentown is Interstate 78, which runs concurrently with Pennsylvania Route 309 along an east-west alignment across the southern portion of the city. I-78 runs from Lebanon County in the west to the Holland Tunnel and Lower Manhattan in the east, while PA 309 runs from Philadelphia in the south to the Wyoming Valley in the north. U.S. Route 22 briefly passes through the northwestern corner of the city as it follows the Lehigh Valley Thruway along an east-west alignment; it runs from Cincinnati, Ohio in the west to Newark, New Jersey in the east. There are nine major inbound roads to Center City Allentown: Airport Road, Cedar Crest Boulevard, Fullerton Avenue, Hamilton Boulevard, Lehigh Street, Mauch Chunk Road, MacArthur Road, Tilghman Street, and Union Boulevard. Interstate 476, the Northeast Extension of the Pennsylvania Turnpike, passes to the west of the Allentown city limits. It runs from Plymouth Meeting outside Philadelphia in the south to Interstate 81 at Clarks Summit in the north.

Public buses in Allentown are provided by LANTA, a bus system serving Lehigh and Northampton counties. Allentown Transportation Center, located on North 7th Street, serves as a major hub for LANTA buses. Multiple private bus lines serve Allentown at the intercity terminal at 325 Hamilton Street, including Trans-Bridge Lines and Greyhound Lines, offering direct bus service throughout the day to New York City's Port Authority Bus Terminal and intermediate points, and Fullington Trailways, which offers direct service to Williamsport, Hazleton, Philadelphia, and intermediate points. Martz Trailways stops in Allentown as part of its route between Scranton-Wilkes-Barre and Philadelphia and its commuter routes to New York City, which are part of the Amtrak Thruway route that connects Amtrak trains at 30th Street Station in Philadelphia. Allentown's public parking is managed by the Allentown Parking Authority.

Rail

Passenger rail

Allentown has no current passenger rail service. The last Allentown rail service, provided by SEPTA, ceased operating in 1979, though one of SEPTA's two main Allentown train stations remains standing. In September 2020, Amtrak, in its Amtrak 2035 expansion plan, proposed restoring rail service between Allentown and New York City by 2035. Use of this mostly single-track route by Amtrak has consistently been opposed by Norfolk Southern Railway, which acquired ownership of the Lehigh Line when it purchased federally-founded Conrail in 1999. Previously, in November 2008, the Lehigh Valley Economic Development Corporation (LVEDC), along with both Lehigh and Northampton County governments, commissioned a study to explore restoring part of the Black Diamond service, which ran until 1961, by extending New Jersey Transit's Raritan Valley Line to Allentown.

Allentown was once a passenger rail hub served by the Central Railroad of New Jersey, using the Lehigh and Susquehanna Railroad, Lehigh and New England Railroad, Lehigh Valley Railroad, the Reading Railroad, the Lehigh Valley Transit Company, and Conrail. Routes served Wilkes-Barre and Scranton to the north, Buffalo and Williamsport to the northwest, Reading and Harrisburg to the west, Jersey City and New York City to the east, and Philadelphia to the south.

Commercial rail

Allentown is a regional center for commercial freight rail traffic. Norfolk Southern's primary Northeast hump classification yards are located in Allentown, and the city is served by R.J. Corman Railroad Group, a commercial railroad company. The city has major commercial rail traffic, including from the Norfolk Southern Lehigh Line, which runs east through the city across the Delaware River, and Norfolk Southern Railway's Reading Line, which runs west through Allentown to Reading.

Utilities

Electricity in Allentown is provided by PPL Corporation, which is headquartered in Allentown. UGI Corporation, headquartered in King of Prussia, supplies natural gas. Two cable companies, RCN Corporation, based in Princeton, New Jersey, and Service Electric, based in Bethlehem, have provided cable service to Allentown since the 1960s. The area's only landfill, Waste Connections of Canada, is locally headquartered in Bethlehem. Water and sewage, prior to 2013, were controlled by the city and are now managed by Lehigh County, following the end of a 50-year lease agreement. Waste, recycling, and yard waste are each administered by the city.

Health care

Lehigh Valley Hospital–Cedar Crest, located on Cedar Crest Boulevard and part of Lehigh Valley Health Network, is Allentown and the Lehigh Valley's largest hospital and the third largest hospital in Pennsylvania with 877 beds and 46 operating rooms. It is also a Level 1 trauma center. St. Luke's University Health Network, Sacred Heart Hospital, and Good Shepherd Rehabilitation Network also provide hospital and rehabilitation services. Allentown State Hospital, a psychiatric hospital in Allentown, was closed in 2010 as part of a statewide closing of psychiatric hospitals by the Pennsylvania Department of Human Services.

Fire department
The Allentown Fire Department, established in 1870, operates six fire stations in the city.

Notable people

Since its 1762 founding, Allentown has been the birthplace or home to several notable Americans, including:

 Stephen Barrett, former psychiatrist and co-founder, Quackwatch
 Clair Blank, former author, Beverly Gray mystery series
 Chakaia Booker, sculptor
 Lillian Briggs, former rock music singer
 Thom Browne, fashion designer
 Frank Buchman, founder of the Oxford Group and Moral Re-Armament religious movements
 Howard J. Buss, composer and music publisher
 Leon Carr, former Broadway composer and television advertising songwriter
 Alexis Cohen, former American Idol contestant, seasons 7 and 8
 Michaela Conlin, film and television actress, Fox's Bones
 Dane DeHaan, film and television actor, In Treatment and Chronicle
 Devon, porn star
 Stanley Dziedzic, former Olympic bronze medalist at 1976 Summer Olympics in freestyle wrestling, 1977 World Champion at World Wrestling Championships
 Gloria Ehret, former professional golfer, winner of the 1966 LPGA Championship
 Victoria Fuller, sculptor 
 James Knoll Gardner, former U.S. federal judge
 Peter Gruner, former professional wrestler known as Billy Kidman
 Scott Haltzman, psychiatrist, relationship counselor, and author
 Tim Heidecker, film and television actor, Tim and Eric Awesome Show, Great Job!
 Lee Iacocca, former chairman of Chrysler
 Keith Jarrett, jazz musician
 Michael Johns, healthcare executive and former White House presidential speechwriter
 Sarah Knauss, supercentenarian, longest-lived American ever, third oldest person verified to have ever lived
 Brian Knobbs, former professional wrestler
 Sally Kohn, journalist and political commentator 
 Carson Kressley, television personality and designer 
 Varvara Lepchenko, professional tennis player
 William Marchant, former playwright and screenwriter
 Tyrese Martin, professional basketball player, Atlanta Hawks
 Ed McCaffrey, former professional football player, Denver Broncos, New York Giants, and San Francisco 49ers
 Lara Jill Miller, actress and voice actress
 Hans Moller, former painter
 Aimee Mullins, paralympian, model, actress
 Lawrence Nuesslein, former Olympic shooting five-time medal winner, 1920 Summer Olympics
 Lil Peep, former emo rapper, singer, songwriter, and model
 Marty Ravellette, armless rehabilitation patient who saved elderly woman from burning car
 Anthony Recker, former professional baseball player, Atlanta Braves, Chicago Cubs, New York Mets, and Oakland Athletics
 Andre Reed, former professional football player, Buffalo Bills and Washington Redskins, and Pro Football Hall of Fame inductee
 Ian Riccaboni, sportscaster, Ring of Honor professional wrestling
 Matt Riddle, UFC professional mixed martial fighter
 Jerry Sags, former professional wrestler
 Larry Seiple, former professional football player, Miami Dolphins, two-time Super Bowl champion
 Amanda Seyfried, actress, Veronica Mars, Big Love, Mamma Mia!, and Les Misérables
 Andrea Tantaros, former political analyst and commentator
 Christine Taylor, actress and wife of actor Ben Stiller
 Mildred Ladner Thompson, former Wall Street Journal reporter
 DeNorval Unthank, former physician and civil rights activist
 Donald Voorhees, former Emmy-nominated orchestral conductor
 Jamie Weinstein, political journalist and commentator
 Lauren Weisberger, author, The Devil Wears Prada
 Hana Wirth-Nesher, literary scholar and university professor, Tel Aviv University
 Chris Wyles, former professional rugby union player with Saracens F.C. and former U.S. national rugby team player

In popular culture

Allentown has a reputation as a rugged blue-collar city and is broadly referenced in popular culture. Examples include:

Portions of the 2019 movie Glass were filmed at Allentown State Hospital and elsewhere in Allentown.
Allentown is mentioned in the 2011 movie The Hangover Part II when Ed Helms sings a profane, modified version of "Allentown" to Zach Galifianakis as they ride in a boat in Thailand. The version appears on the film's soundtrack, The Hangover Part II: Original Motion Picture Soundtrack.
Allentown is mentioned in the lyrics of indie rock band Say Anything in their song "Fed to Death," which is the opening song on their 2009 album Say Anything.
In the 2008 movie The Wrestler, Allentown is mentioned by Mickey Rourke as a location where he had wrestled as he trained for his comeback.
Portions of the 2005 music video for "Dirty Little Secret" by The All-American Rejects were shot at various Allentown locations.
On Season 4, Episode 9 of the HBO series The Sopranos, titled "Whoever Did This", which first aired November 10, 2002, the scene in which Christopher Moltisanti is ordered by Tony Soprano to dispose of the remains of Ralph Cifaretto after Tony kills him were filmed in neighboring Lower Nazareth Township.
Portions of the 1988 movie Hairspray were filmed at Dorney Park & Wildwater Kingdom and other Allentown locations.
Allentown is the subject of the Billy Joel song, "Allentown," which was originally released on his 1982 The Nylon Curtain album. The song uses Allentown as a metaphor for the resilience of working class Americans in distressed industrial cities during the recession of the early 1980s.
Frank Zappa's song "200 Years Old," which appears on his 1975 album Bongo Fury, mentions Allentown.
 Portions of the 1968 film Where Angels Go, Trouble Follows were filmed at Dorney Park & Wildwater Kingdom and other Allentown locations.
Hiding The Bell, a 1968 historical fiction novel by Ruth Nulton Moore, chronicles the hiding of the Liberty Bell in Allentown during the American Revolutionary War.
Allentown is mentioned in two of Broadway's most successful musicals, 42nd Street, which debuted in 1980, and Bye Bye Birdie, which debuted in 1958.
Exterior shots of Allentown's PPL Building, the city's tallest building, are featured throughout the 1954 movie Executive Suite.

Notes

References

Further reading
 Adams, Anna. "Perception Matters: Pentecostal Latinas in Allentown, Pennsylvania." in A reader in Latina feminist theology (U of Texas Press, 2021) pp. 98–113
 Lee, George A. "Negroes in a Medium-Sized Metropolis: Allentown, Pennsylvania--A Case Study." Journal of Negro Education 37.4 (1968): 397–405. online
 Marzan, Gilbert. "Still Looking for that Elsewhere: Puerto Rican Poverty and Migration in the Northeast." Centro Journal (2009) 21#1 pp 100–117 online; full coverage on Allentown
 Sandoval, Edgar. The New Face of Small-town America: Snapshots of Latino Life in Allentown, Pennsylvania (Penn State Press, 2010)

External links

Allentown at Discover Lehigh Valley
Allentown at visitPA
Allentown news at The Morning Call
Allentown news at Lehigh Valley Live
"Famous People from the Lehigh Valley," The Morning Call, August 18, 2006

 
1735 establishments in Pennsylvania
Cities in Lehigh County, Pennsylvania
Cities in Pennsylvania
County seats in Pennsylvania
Populated places established in 1735
Populated places on the Lehigh River